The Palace of Khudayar Khan, known as the Pearl of Kokand, was the palace of the last ruler of the Kokand Khanate, Khudayar Khan. It is the most visited tourism attraction in Uzbekistan’s Fergana Valley.

History 
The Palace of Khudayar Khan, also known as Kokand Urda, was built in the early 1870s. It was the last in a series of seven palaces, each grander than the last, and it was intended to project the power of the khan. The architect was Mir Ubaydullo, and the palace is said to have been built by 80 master builders and 16,000 conscripted labourers. The American diplomat Eugene Schuyler described the palace as being "much larger and more magnificent than any other in Central Asia... glittering in all the brightness of its fresh tiles, blue, yellow and green." 

During the Russian Conquest of Central Asia, Tsarist troops seized and liquidated the Khanate of Kokand, turning it into a vassal state. Khudayar Khan initially took a pro-Russian stance but was forced into exile, leaving his palace behind. The property was looted.

During the Bolshevik Revolution, Kokand and from 1917-18 had an anti-Bolshevik Provisional Government. When the Bolsheviks did take control of the city in 1918, they demolished the majority of the palace, including all of the harem, leaving just 19 original rooms out of nearly 120.

Description
The palace stands within landscaped gardens in the centre of Kokand. The total site is four hectares, and the original building was 138 m long and 68 m wide. The main entrance is 5 m above ground level and accessed via a ramp. 

The entire facade is richly tiled, with a mixture of geometric patterns and inscriptions. Above the gateway, an Arabic inscription reads “High Palace of  Seid Muhammad Khudayar Khan”. The use of yellow and green in the colour scheme makes this building distinct (and dates it later) than the mostly blue and turquoise monuments found elsewhere in Uzbekistan.

Originally the palace had seven courtyards and 114 (or, by some accounts, 119) rooms. Of these original spaces, 5 courtyards and 19 rooms survive. Many of the interiors have been restored, and there are particularly fine examples of wood carving, panelled and painted ceilings, and wall paintings. The throne room is intact and you can sit on a replica throne: is in the Hermitage Museum in St Petersburg.

Construction
Constructed by sixteen thousand conscripted or enslaved workers using one thousand carts to transport materials, the eighty master builders designed and built an ornate structure of variegated colors and rich ornaments with geometric patterns, arabesques, and floral motifs all made from ceramic tiles and based on tales of the Orient.

Current use
Today the palace is a national monument and a museum. It is open to the public and guided tours are available. The palace is also used as a venue for many of Kokand’s festivals and events, including the biennial International Festival of Handicrafters.

References 

Fergana Region
Residential buildings in Uzbekistan